The posterior division of the coccygeal nerve does not divide into a medial and a lateral branch, but receives a communicating branch from the last sacral; it is distributed to the skin over the back of the coccyx.

References 

Spinal nerves